Peter H. Schiller (May 5, 1931 in Berlin) is a professor emeritus of Neuroscience in the Department of Brain and Cognitive Sciences at the Massachusetts Institute of Technology (MIT). He is well known for his work on the behavioral, neurophysiological and pharmacological studies of the primate visual and oculomotor systems.

Life and career
Schiller was born in 1931 in Berlin, Germany (his father was the Gestalt psychologist Paul von Schiller). His family moved to Budapest in 1934, then to the United States in 1948, where he lives now as a Naturalized American Citizen. After graduating from Duke University (1955), and after his US military service (in Germany, 1955-1957), he enrolled in a graduate program at Clark University (1959), where he earned his PhD with a thesis on visual masking and metacontrast, before accepting an invitation by Hans-Lukas Teuber to work at MIT’s Department of Psychology (1962). He has lived in Newton, MA ever since.

For more than 40 years, Schiller has been a member of the MIT faculty. He has trained more than 20 doctoral students and postdoctoral fellows, among them Larry Squire, Michael Stryker, Max Cynader, John H. R. Maunsell, and Nikos Logothetis.

Honors
 Member of the National Academy of Sciences
 Member of the American Academy of Arts and Sciences
 Honorary member of the Hungarian Academy of Sciences 
 Pepose Vision Science Award

Professional services
 NIH Experimental Psychology Study Section, 1973-1977 
 NIH Visual Sciences B Study Section, 1982-1986 
 Editorial Board, Journal of Neurophysiology, 1983-1989 
 Editorial Board, Vision Research, 1987-1990 
 Editorial Board, Visual Neuroscience, 1992-1997
 Organizer of numerous symposia including those for IBRO, Society for Neuroscience (SFN), ARVO, WBC, Vision Sciences Society (VSS)

Grants
Continuous funding from 
 National Institutes of Health 
 National Science Foundation 
 Office of Naval Research

Research

Studies in eye movement control
By recording from the oculomotor neurons in the superior colliculi and frontal eye fields of the alert rhesus monkey as well as performing lesion and electrical stimulation experiments on these areas, Schiller has identified and characterized two parallel neural pathways involved in the generation of visually-guided saccadic eye movements. The superior colliculus, which is subcortical, receives visual input from the retina and visual cortex in its upper layers and contains neurons in its lower layers that command saccadic eye movements to the location of visual targets, while the cortical frontal eye fields, which have direct and independent access to the eye-movement controllers in the brain stem, help select targets in the visual scene to which the eyes must be directed. The major result that has emerged from this work is that the superior colliculus is involved in bringing the center of gaze to the new target (foveation) by utilizing a vector code that specifies the error between the present and intended eye positions, a coding scheme that was later shown to be prevalent throughout the neocortex, including the frontal eye fields. Using ablation experiments, Schiller further showed that a lesion of the superior colliculus eliminates express saccades, those occurring at latencies of less than 100 ms. It is believed that the posterior channel, the visual cortex via the superior colliculus, mediates express saccades, while the anterior channel that includes the frontal eye fields is important for target selection.

Studies in vision and visual perception
In a series of now classic studies Schiller characterized the functions of two sets of parallel pathways in the visual system: The On- and Off- pathways and the midget and parasol pathways. By administering 2-amino-4-phosphono-butyrate (APB) to the eye, he was able to inactivate the ON-retinal pathway reversibly and demonstrate that the On- and Off-pathways remain segregated from the retina to the striate cortex. Behavioral studies established that following blockage of the On-pathway, animals no longer responded to light increments.  The central idea that has emerged from this work is that there exist specific neural circuitries for perceiving brightness and darkness, an idea first proposed by Ewald Hering in the 19th Century and thereafter by Richard Jung.

Schiller further found that the midget channel (or parvocellular system) plays a central role in the wavelength and spatial domains: color vision, high spatial frequency form, shape, texture perception, and fine stereopsis. In comparison, the parasol channel (or magnocellular system) plays an important role in the temporal domain: low contrast, high velocity motion, motion parallax, and flicker perception. The lesion studies of Schiller established that this functional segregation tends to be diminished once signals reach the neocortex, although the middle temporal area of neocortex is still dedicated to motion processing.

Feature detectors vs multi-function analyzers
In a position paper “On the specificity of neurons and visual areas” Schiller (1996) proposed that individual neurons in the primate visual cortex in addition to being feature detectors for color, form, motion, depth, texture, and shape perception are multifunctional, performing complex visual tasks such as view-independent object recognition, visual learning, spatial generalization, visual attention, and stimulus selection. With Karl Zipser and Victor Lamme, he found that stimulus context that falls far outside of the classical receptive field can modulate the response to the center. These findings have been verified in other mammals in addition to primates.

A cortical prosthesis to help blind people "see"
The work of Schiller has spawned renewed interest in the development of visuo-cortical prostheses for the blind. While doing electrical-stimulation experiments with Edward Tehovnik in 2001, Schiller observed that if he delivered electrical pulses to the visual cortex while an animal was planning an eye movement into the visual receptive field of the cells under study he could bias saccade execution and even evoke saccadic eye movements into the visual receptive field using currents of less than 50 μA. Using such low currents in combination with visual psychophysics, he was able to estimate the size, contrast, and color of phosphenes evoked from the visual cortex of monkeys. This line of work is now being used to assess visual prosthetic devices, which could eventually lead to a functional visual prosthesis for blind people.

Textbook
In 2015, Peter Schiller along with his coauthor, Edward Tehovnik, published a textbook (Vision and the Visual System) that summarized his work within the context of major discoveries on the primate visual system between 1970 and 2015. This book provides a detailed account of the knowledge required of any modern-day visual neuroscientists, young or old.

Personal life
Married to Ann Howell, deceased. Three children: David, Kyle and Sarah. Hobbies: sailing, playing tennis, skiing, sculpturing and artwork.

References

External links 

 Profile of Peter H. Schiller (PNAS)
 Schiller selected to receive Vision Sciences award (BrandeisNow)

Schiller
Clark University alumni
1931 births
Vision scientists
Massachusetts Institute of Technology School of Science faculty
Living people
Duke University alumni